Rüütel is an Estonian surname (meaning knight). Notable people with the surname include:

Arnold Rüütel (born 1928), politician, President of Estonia 2001–2006
Ingrid Rüütel (born 1935), folklorist and philologist, First Lady of Estonia 2001–2006, wife of President Arnold Rüütel
Kai Rüütel (born 1981), opera singer
Margit Rüütel (born 1983), tennis player
Raido Rüütel (born 1951), racing driver

See also
Rüütli

Estonian-language surnames
Occupational surnames